General Chakravarthi is a 1978 Indian Tamil-language film, directed by  D. Yoganand and produced by Chinna Annamalai. The film stars Sivaji Ganesan and K. R. Vijaya. It was released on 16 June 1978, and emerged a success.

Plot 
Chakravarthi is a proud, straightforward, honest General. He is married to Bharathi and has a daughter Rani. He gets transferred and intends to take his family with him but they create hurdles and manage to evade going with him. Unknown to him, his daughter is pregnant and the father, Sekar, is believed to be dead. If the General finds out, either he will kill himself in humiliation or will kill his daughter, whom he dotes in anger or both.

How they manage to get the baby out of the way without the father finding out is the rest of the story.

Cast 
Sivaji Ganesan as General Chakravarthi
K. R. Vijaya as Dr. Bharathi
Mohan Sharma as Sekar
Kavitha as Rani
Thengai Srinivasan as Soman Nayar
Manorama as Ponnamma
T. P. Muthulakshmi as Annamma
Typist Gopu as Hotel owner
Usilamani

Soundtrack 
The music was composed by M. S. Viswanathan, with lyrics by Kannadasan.

Reception 
P. S. M. of Kalki said the film should be watched for the performances of Ganesan and Vijaya.

References

Bibliography

External links 
 

1970s Tamil-language films
1978 films
Films directed by D. Yoganand
Films scored by M. S. Viswanathan
Indian Army in films